The black swan (Cygnus atratus) is a large waterbird, a species of swan which breeds mainly in the southeast and southwest regions of Australia.  Within Australia, the black swan is nomadic, with erratic migration patterns dependent upon climatic conditions. It is a large bird with black plumage and a red bill. It is a monogamous breeder, with both partners sharing incubation and cygnet-rearing duties.

The black swan was introduced to various countries as an ornamental bird in the 1800s, but has managed to escape and form stable populations. Described scientifically by English naturalist John Latham in 1790, the black swan was formerly placed into a monotypic genus, Chenopis. Black swans can be found singly, or in loose companies numbering into the hundreds or even thousands. It is a popular bird in zoological gardens and bird collections, and escapees are sometimes seen outside their natural range.

This bird is a regional symbol of both Western Australia, where it is native, and the English town of Dawlish, where it is an introduced species.

Description

Black swans are black-feathered birds, with white flight feathers. The bill is bright red, with a pale bar and tip; and legs and feet are greyish-black. Cobs (males) are slightly larger than pens (females), with a longer and straighter bill. Cygnets (immature birds) are a greyish-brown with pale-edged feathers.

The neck is long (relatively the longest neck among the swans) and curved in an "S"-shape.

The black swan utters a musical and far reaching bugle-like sound, called either on the water or in flight, as well as a range of softer crooning notes. It can also whistle, especially when disturbed while breeding and nesting.

When swimming, black swans hold their necks arched or erect and often carry their feathers or wings raised in an aggressive display. In flight, a wedge of black swans will form as a line or a V, with the individual birds flying strongly with undulating long necks, making whistling sounds with their wings and baying, bugling or trumpeting calls.

The black swan is unlike any other Australian bird, although in poor light and at long range it may be confused with a magpie goose in flight. However, the black swan can be distinguished by its much longer neck and slower wing beat.

One captive population of black swans in Lakeland, Florida has produced a few individuals which are a light mottled grey colour instead of black. White black swans are also known to exist; these individuals, which are leucistic, are believed to occur rarely in the wild.

Distribution

The black swan is common in the wetlands of southwestern and eastern Australia and adjacent coastal islands. In the south west its range encompasses an area between North West Cape, Cape Leeuwin and Eucla; while in the east it covers a large region bounded by the Atherton Tableland, the Eyre Peninsula and Tasmania, with the Murray Darling Basin supporting very large populations of black swans. It is uncommon in central and northern Australia.

The black swan's preferred habitat extends across fresh, brackish and salt water lakes, swamps and rivers with underwater and emergent vegetation for food and nesting materials. It also favors permanent wetlands, including ornamental lakes, but can also be found in flooded pastures and tidal mudflats, and occasionally on the open sea near islands or the shore.

The black swan was once thought to be sedentary, but is now known to be highly nomadic. There is no set migratory pattern, but rather opportunistic responses to either rainfall or drought. In high rainfall years, emigration occurs from the south west and south east into the interior, with a reverse migration to these heartlands in drier years. When rain does fall in the arid central regions, black swans will migrate to these areas to nest and raise their young. However, should dry conditions return before the young have been raised, the adult birds will abandon the nests and their eggs or cygnets and return to wetter areas.

The black swan, like many other water fowl, loses all its flight feathers at once when it moults after breeding and is unable to fly for about a month. During this time it will usually settle on large, open waters for safety.

The species has a large range, with figures between 1 and 10 million km2 given as the extent of occurrence. The current global population is estimated to be up to 500,000 individuals.  No threat of extinction or significant decline in population has been identified with this numerous and widespread bird.

Black swans were first seen by Europeans in 1697, when Willem de Vlamingh's expedition explored the Swan River, Western Australia.

Introduced populations

New Zealand

Before the arrival of the Māori in New Zealand, a related species of swan known as the New Zealand swan had developed there, but was apparently hunted to extinction. In 1864, the Australian black swan was introduced to New Zealand as an ornamental waterfowl and populations are now common on larger coastal or inland lakes, especially Rotorua Lakes, Lake Wairarapa, Lake Ellesmere, and the Chatham Islands. Black swans have also naturally flown to New Zealand, leading scientists to consider them a native rather than exotic species, although the present population appears to be largely descended from deliberate introductions.

United Kingdom
The black swan is also very popular as an ornamental waterbird in western Europe, especially Britain, and escapees are commonly reported. As yet, the population in Britain is not considered to be self-sustaining and so the species is not afforded admission to the official British List, but the Wildfowl and Wetlands Trust have recorded a maximum of nine breeding pairs in the UK in 2001, with an estimate of 43 feral birds in 2003–2004.
A small population of black swans exists on the River Thames at Marlow, on the brook running through the small town of Dawlish  in Devon, near the River Itchen, Hampshire, and the River Tees near Stockton on Tees. The Dawlish population is so well associated with the town that the bird has been the town's emblem for forty years.

Japan
There are also wild populations in Japan, having originally been imported during 1950–1960.

United States

Black swans have been reported in Florida, but there is no evidence that they are breeding; persistent sightings may be due to continual releases or escapes. Orange County, California reported black swans in Lake Forest, Irvine and Newport Beach on October 5, 2020, and Santa Ana in December 2021 in the “Versailles on the Lake” apartment community. The "Lake Forest Keys” community bought the original swans about eight to ten years ago and since then there have been many births and gaggles from the original couple" according to a report in the Orange County Register. Black swans formerly resided in the vicinity of Lake Junaluska, a large lake in Waynesville, North Carolina.

Mainland China
Black swans can also be found in Mainland China. In 2018 one group of swans was introduced to the Shenzhen University campus on an artificial lake in Guangdong Province.

Behaviour

Diet and feeding
The black swan is almost exclusively herbivorous, and while there is some regional and seasonal variation, the diet is generally dominated by aquatic and marshland plants. In New South Wales the leaf of reedmace (genus Typha) is the most important food of birds in wetlands, followed by submerged algae and aquatic plants such as Vallisneria. In Queensland, aquatic plants such as Potamogeton, stoneworts, and algae are the dominant foods. The exact composition varies with water level; in flood situations where normal foods are out of reach black swans will feed on pasture plants on shore. The black swan feeds in a similar manner to other swans. When feeding in shallow water it will dip its head and neck under the water and it is able to keep its head flat against the bottom while keeping its body horizontal. In deeper water the swan up-ends to reach lower. Black swans are also able to filter feed at the water's surface.

Nesting and reproduction
Like other swans, the black swan is largely monogamous, pairing for life (about 6% divorce rate). Recent studies have shown that around a third of all broods exhibit extra-pair paternity. An estimated one-quarter of all pairings are homosexual, mostly between males.  They steal nests, or form temporary threesomes with females to obtain eggs, driving away the female after she lays the eggs.

Generally, black swans in the Southern hemisphere nest in the wetter winter months (February to September), occasionally in large colonies. A black swan nest is essentially a large heap or mound of reeds, grasses and weeds between 1 and 1.5 metres (3– feet) in diameter and up to 1 metre high, in shallow water or on islands. A nest is reused every year, restored or rebuilt as needed. Both parents share the care of the nest.  A typical clutch contains four to eight greenish-white eggs that are incubated for about 35–40 days. Incubation begins after the laying of the last egg, to synchronise the hatching of the chicks. Prior to the commencement of incubation the parent will sit over the eggs without actually warming them. Both sexes incubate the eggs, with the female incubating at night. The change over between incubation periods is marked by ritualised displays by both sexes. If eggs accidentally roll out of the nest both sexes will retrieve the egg using the neck (in other swan species only the female performs this feat). Like all swans, black swans will aggressively defend their nests with their wings and beaks. After hatching, the cygnets are tended by the parents for about nine months until fledging. Cygnets may ride on their parent's back for longer trips into deeper water, but black swans undertake this behaviour less frequently than mute and black-necked swans.

Relationship with humans

Conservation
The black swan is protected in New South Wales, Australia under the National Parks and Wildlife Act 1974 (s.5). The Black Swan is fully protected in all states and territories of Australia and must not be shot. 
 It is evaluated as Least Concern on the IUCN Red List of Threatened Species.

Australian culture

The black swan was a literary or artistic image among Europeans even before their arrival in Australia. Cultural reference has been based on symbolic contrast and as a distinctive motif.

The black swan's role in Australian heraldry and culture extends to the first founding of the colonies in the eighteenth century. It has often been equated with antipodean identity, the contrast to the white swan of the northern hemisphere indicating 'Australianness'. The black swan is featured on the flag, and is both the state bird and state emblem of Western Australia; it also appears in the Coat of Arms and other iconography of the state's institutions. The Black Swan was the sole postage stamp design of Western Australia from 1854 to 1902.

Indigenous Australia
The Noongar People of the South-West of Australia call the black swan Kooldjak along the West and South-West coast, Gooldjak in the South East and it is sometimes referred to as maali in language schools.

See also
 Black swan theory, a theory about outlier events (such as Europeans discovering a black swan)
 List of Latin phrases (R): rara avis in terris nigroque simillima cygno ("a rare bird in the lands, and very like a black swan") Juvenal, Satires, VI

References

Citations

Works cited

External links

 Black Swan videos, photos & sounds on the Internet Bird Collection

black swan
black swan
black swan
Birds of Western Australia
black swan
black swan
Birds of Victoria (Australia)
Birds of New South Wales
Birds of Tasmania
Endemic birds of Australia